The Seongnam Arts Center (성남아트센터) is the largest venue for cultural events in the city of Seongnam. It is in Yatap-dong in Bundang, within a few minutes' walk of Imae Station. And it is situated near the Taewon High school. So students of this school often visit Seongnam Arts Center. The Seongnam Arts Center was first opened on 14 October 2005 by the Seongam Cultural Foundation.

Performing venues
The Seongnam Arts Center is able to put on any kind of performance from ballet, to opera, to jazz, in its three main performance areas:

The Opera House seats 1,805 and is capable of hosting operas, musicals, plays, ballets, and concerts. It is intended as a link between local and international culture.  
The Concert Hall was acoustically designed with classical music performances in mind. This two-story facility seats 996. 
The Ensemble Theatre, seats 398, in addition to the regular stage, has a T-stage wrapping itself around the seats, allowing the performance to come closer to the audience.

Galleries
The arts center is also home to two galleries displaying work from both international and domestic artists. The facility is divided into 5 exhibition rooms in two separate sections of the Arts Center: 
 The Main Gallery has three exhibition rooms and is located under the Opera House.   
 The Annex Gallery has two exhibition rooms and is located on the first floor of the Ensemble Theater.

Other facilities
In the Opera House, on the first floor, a free daycare is available for parents while they enjoy the performance. Space is limited to about 15 children, which are supervised by two trained childcare specialists. On the next floor down, The Uptown Dinner provides casual Italian food in a comfortable atmosphere while a convenience store close by sells snacks.

The Seongnam Arts Center Art Shop is underneath the Ensemble Theater, selling works by first-class artists. By the Art Shop, flowers can be purchased in the Arts Flower Shop. There is also ample parking space, both above and below the ground.

Known as the Academy, a variety of courses are available for the public in the areas of both fine and the performing arts. Facilities such as music, ballet and art rooms are in the Concert Hall and the Ensemble Theater.

Events
 2009: musical, Namhansanseong is based on the novel of the same name by Kim Hoon, which is based on the incident of Byeongjahoran, in which during the Second Manchu invasion of Korea in 1636, when King Injo of Joseon Dynasty took refuge in the Namhan Mountain Fortress in Gyeonggi-do, in an ill-fated attempt to defy the rule of the Manchu Qing Empire Hong Taiji, following the First Manchu invasion of Korea in 1627. But the musical focuses on the lives of common people and their spirit of survival during harsh situations. It stars Yesung of boy band Super Junior as villain "Jung Myung-soo", a servant-turned-interpreter. It was shown from 9 October to 4 November at the Opera House.

See also
 List of concert halls

References

External links
 Seongnam Arts Center official homepage 

Bundang
Buildings and structures in Gyeonggi Province
Tourist attractions in Gyeonggi Province
Arts centres